Amol Ratan Balwadkar is a social worker and corporator in Pune Municipal Corporation from Baner-Balewadi ward of Pune as a member of Bharatiya Janata Party. In March 2017, he won the corporation election. He is also general secretary of Bhartiya Janata Party Yuva Morcha Pune city.

References 

1987 births
Living people
Maharashtra politicians
People from Pune
Bharatiya Janata Party politicians from Maharashtra